LVH Academy is a primary and secondary school in Malegaon, Maharashtra, India.  It was founded in 1983 by Loknete Vyankatrao Hiray.

HCL digi-learning is used in the school. It has a Wi-Fi campus of Mahatma GandhiI Vidyamandir. 

The school is in two parts. Its left side four floor building gives education to the CBSE, ICSE pattern. The right side three floor building gives education to the MSBSE, SSC pattern.

High schools and secondary schools in Maharashtra
Education in Nashik district
Malegaon
Educational institutions established in 1983
1983 establishments in Maharashtra